The knockout stage of the 2010 FIFA World Cup was the second and final stage of the World Cup, following the group stage. It began on 26 June with the round of 16 matches, and ended on 11 July with the final match of the tournament held at Soccer City, Johannesburg, in which Spain beat the Netherlands 1–0 after extra time to claim their first World Cup. The top two teams from each group (16 in total) advanced to the knockout stage to compete in a single-elimination style tournament. A third place match was included and played between the two losing teams of the semi-finals.

In the knockout stage (including the final), if a match was level at the end of 90 minutes, two periods of extra time (15 minutes each) would be played. If the score was still level after extra time, the match would be decided by a penalty shoot-out.

All times listed are South African Standard Time (UTC+2)

Qualified teams
The top two placed teams from each of the eight groups qualified for the knockout stage.

Bracket

Round of 16

Uruguay vs South Korea
Uruguay vs South Korea was the first match in the Round of 16. The match was held at the Nelson Mandela Bay Stadium in Port Elizabeth before a low crowd of 30,597. Uruguay won the match 2–1. Uruguay's two goals came from Luis Suárez, the second of which broke a 1–1 deadlock in the 80th minute. Suárez's first was scored when Diego Forlán made a low cross from the left that was not dealt with by the Korean defence, leaving Suárez to score at the back post. Uruguay subsequently adopted a defensive posture and Korea had more chances to score. Eventually, Lee Chung-yong equalised in the 68th minute, scoring a headed goal following a free kick. Despite Korea then having chances to win the match, it was Suárez who scored Uruguay's winner in the 80th minute with a curling strike from the edge of the 18-yard box that went in off the inside of the post. Suarez's goal was regarded as one of the tournament's best. Korea missed more good chances in the final minutes of the game, giving Uruguay victory and passage to the quarter-finals for the first time since 1970, where they would face Ghana. After the match, the Uruguayan coach Óscar Tabárez attributed his team's successful run to the number of players with experience at top-level overseas clubs. Korean coach Huh Jung-moo claimed his side "controlled" the match and that Uruguay's goals were "lucky".

United States vs Ghana
The match between the United States and Ghana was played on 26 June 2010 at the Royal Bafokeng Stadium in Rustenburg. The match was watched by 19 million Americans, making it the most watched association football match in American television history. The match was won by Ghana in extra time after Asamoah Gyan broke a 1–1 deadlock. Kevin-Prince Boateng scored the opening goal of the match for Ghana in the fifth minute. The goal followed an error by Ricardo Clark, who lost the ball to the Ghanaians in midfield. Boateng took the ball to the edge of the penalty area, beating United States goalkeeper Tim Howard with a low left-footed shot. Landon Donovan equalised with a penalty kick in the 62nd minute, which was awarded after Jonathan Mensah fouled Clint Dempsey. The United States had chances to win the game thereafter but were unable to get past Ghana goalkeeper Richard Kingson. The match thus went to extra time. In the third minute, Gyan latched onto a high long ball, chesting it down and holding off two defenders before scoring the winner. After the match, Ghana's coach Milovan Rajevac hailed his side's achievement in becoming one of the "best eight teams in the world", but regretted the number of players that would miss the quarter-final match against Uruguay because of injury or suspension. The president of the United States Soccer Federation, Sunil Gulati, lamented the team's failure to make the quarter-finals and thereby further raise the profile of the sport in the United States.

Germany vs England
Germany and England played each other on 27 June 2010 at the Free State Stadium in Bloemfontein. Germany took the lead in the 20th minute after English defenders Matthew Upson and John Terry were at fault in allowing Miroslav Klose to latch on to a long goal kick from Manuel Neuer and score. Lukas Podolski doubled Germany's lead 12 minutes later, although England pulled one goal back through Upson in the 37th minute, heading in a cross from Steven Gerrard. A controversial moment then occurred in the 39th minute: a shot by Frank Lampard was not awarded as a goal despite the ball bouncing off the crossbar and clearly crossing the line by at least a foot. Had the goal been awarded, England would have equalised at 2–2. Thomas Müller subsequently scored two goals in the second half, extending Germany's lead to 4–1. His first came at the end of a swift German counter-attack in the 67th minute, the goal being assisted by Bastian Schweinsteiger. His second came from an error by Gareth Barry and was set up by Mesut Özil. Germany won the match, 4–1. Germany progressed to meet Argentina in the quarter-final.

The ghost goal incident in this match was a major factor in the FIFA and IFAB decision to test and later implement new rules allowing goal-line technology to be used in football.

Argentina vs Mexico
Argentina and Mexico met on 27 June 2010 at Soccer City in Johannesburg. Argentina won the match 3–1 for a place in the quarter-finals against Germany. The match was overshadowed by a refereeing error that allowed Argentina's opening goal. Carlos Tevez headed the ball into the net from a Lionel Messi pass in the 25th minute, but replays showed there were no players between Tevez and the goal, rendering his goal clearly offside. Replays of the goal were shown in the stadium but the decision to award the goal was not overturned. Tevez said he knew that the goal was offside, but chose not to say anything. Argentina's second goal came from a defensive error from Ricardo Osorio as a poor pass out of defence was snatched by Gonzalo Higuaín to round the keeper and score. After half-time, Tevez scored his second goal of the match to give Argentina a three-goal lead, with a long range shot that found the top corner of the Mexican goal. Javier Hernández scored for Mexico in the 71st minute but it turned out to be no more than a consolation goal, as Argentina held on to win 3–1. Mexico's coach Javier Aguirre resigned after the match, accepting responsibility for not meeting the team's target of the quarter-finals. Tevez conceded that he was aware his first goal was offside at the time, although Aguirre deflected the blame for his side's loss away from the refereeing.

Netherlands vs Slovakia
The Netherlands defeated Slovakia 2–1 on 28 June 2010 at the Moses Mabhida Stadium in Durban. The Netherlands' first goal was an excellent individual effort from Arjen Robben in the 18th minute, taking on the Slovak defence with the ball before scoring from 25 yards. The Dutch had chances to extend their lead in the second half, with the most prominent coming when Robben cut inside on his left foot just like he did when he scored the first goal, but this time, Slovak goalkeeper Ján Mucha saved the shot going to his far post. The Slovaks also had two big opportunities to equalise but forced a save from Maarten Stekelenburg each time. The Dutch sealed their win in the 84th minute when Wesley Sneijder scored off an assist from Dirk Kuyt into an unguarded net after Kuyt got the ball past Mucha. Róbert Vittek slotted a penalty kick late in stoppage time, but it was no more than a consolation goal for Slovakia. The penalty had been awarded for a trip on him by Stekelenburg. The Netherlands' win threatened to be overshadowed by Robin van Persie responding angrily to being substituted by coach Bert van Marwijk. Van Marwijk called a team meeting over the incident and later insisted that there was no residual unrest in the squad.

Brazil vs Chile
Brazil soundly defeated Chile 3–0 on 28 June 2010 at Ellis Park Stadium, Johannesburg to progress to a quarter-final match against the Netherlands. Brazil's first goal came from a corner kick taken by Maicon in the 34th minute, with Juan heading the ball into the goal without being marked. Brazil had doubled its lead within five minutes after a free-flowing passing movement involving Robinho and Kaká that teed up Luís Fabiano to score after taking the ball around the Chilean goalkeeper. Robinho himself sealed victory for Brazil in the second half, scoring following a long run with the ball by Ramires. After the match, Chile's coach Marcelo Bielsa conceded that his team had been outplayed, arguing that in his position there was "little one can do" when up against a team of Brazil's quality.

Paraguay vs Japan
Paraguay and Japan met at the Loftus Versfeld Stadium in Pretoria on 29 June 2010. The match was decided by a penalty shootout after the score was locked at 0–0 for 120 minutes. Paraguay won the shootout and progressed to their first ever World Cup quarter-final. The match was a generally unexciting affair, as Japan adopted a defensive posture while Paraguay itself maintained a solid defence. The first half produced the occasional chance on goal with Lucas Barrios having a shot saved shortly before a long-distance shot from Daisuke Matsui hit the crossbar of Paraguay's goal. The second half was similar, with either side producing occasional chances to score rather than periods of dominance. The result of the deadlock was extra time, which continued goalless. A penalty shootout ensued, in which Yuichi Komano missed a spot kick for Japan. Paraguay scored all five of its penalties, clinching the win and passage to the quarter-finals. After the match, Japan's coach Takeshi Okada resigned and Shunsuke Nakamura retired from international football.

Spain vs Portugal

Spain defeated Portugal 1–0 in the Iberian derby to progress to the quarter finals where they were to play Paraguay. The match took place on 29 June 2010 at the Cape Town Stadium. Spain dominated their neighbours with a ball possession ratio of 62% and several opportunities but had to endure a pair of missed chances by the Portuguese in the first half, including one by Hugo Almeida which nearly resulted in a goal. In the second half, the Portuguese attacking threat decreased and the entry of Fernando Llorente for Fernando Torres brought new energy to the Spanish team. The only goal of the match came in the 63rd minute: David Villa picked up a brilliant pass by Xavi, having his first shot saved, but then lifted the rebound into the roof of the net. Post-match replays showed that the goal was scored from an offside position ( according to ESPN axis).

Quarter-finals

Netherlands vs Brazil

The Netherlands versus Brazil was the first quarter-final match, held on 2 July 2010 at the Nelson Mandela Bay Stadium in Port Elizabeth. The Netherlands won 2–1 after recovering from a 1–0 deficit, knocking the five-time world champions Brazil out of the tournament. The Netherlands' team was affected by an injury to Joris Mathijsen before the match. His replacement in defence – André Ooijer – and fellow central defender John Heitinga were at fault for Brazil's opening goal in the 10th minute, when Robinho was allowed to latch onto a deep pass from Felipe Melo and score without being challenged by the defence. For the rest of the first half, the Dutch were largely frustrated by the Brazilian defence, and needed to rely on Maarten Stekelenburg's goalkeeping to prevent Brazil from extending its lead. However, eight minutes after half-time, the Dutch equalised through a goal from Sneijder. The goal was initially recorded as an own goal by Felipe Melo, but FIFA overturned the decision to credit the goal to Sneijder. Having equalised, the Netherlands subsequently took the lead from a Robben corner kick in the 68th minute, Sneijder heading the ball in after a flick-on from Kuyt. Brazil's chances of restoring parity were damaged when Felipe Melo was sent off for a stamp on Robben. The Netherlands held out for the win, thereby earning passage to the semi-finals. Brazil's coach Dunga confirmed after the match that he would be leaving the position upon the expiry of his contract, admitting responsibility for Brazil's defeat. The Dutch coach Bert van Marwijk attacked the Brazilian team after the match, claiming they had provoked his side, and that Melo's stamp on Robben left him "ashamed for Brazilian football."

Uruguay vs Ghana
Uruguay and Ghana met on 2 July 2010 at Soccer City, Johannesburg for a place in the semi-final against the Netherlands. It was the first time that the teams had ever played each other in a senior competitive football match. After a dramatic 120 minutes of play (including extra time) that finished 1–1, Uruguay won in a penalty shoot-out 4–2. Uruguay dominated the early periods of the match, but suffered an injury to captain Diego Lugano in the first half. Just before half-time, Ghana took the lead when Sulley Muntari was allowed time on the ball by Uruguay, and took advantage by scoring with a shot from 40 yards. After half-time, Diego Forlán pulled Uruguay level with a free kick from the left side of the field that went over the head of Ghana's goalkeeper Richard Kingson. While both teams had chances to win, the match proceeded to extra time as the scores remained level. Late in extra time, Ghana sent a free kick into the penalty area; Luis Suárez blocked Stephen Appiah's shot on the goal line. On the rebound, Dominic Adiyiah's header was heading into the goal, but Suárez blatantly blocked the shot with his hand to save what would have been the extra-time winner and he was red carded. Asamoah Gyan missed the ensuing penalty kick off the crossbar and Suárez celebrated the miss. In the shootout, Gyan converted his penalty, as did everybody else until Uruguay goalkeeper Fernando Muslera saved captain John Mensah's penalty (Ghana's third). Uruguay's Maxi Pereira then hit his penalty over the bar, but then Adiyiah's penalty was saved by Muslera. Sebastián Abreu converted Uruguay's fifth spot kick by lightly chipping it Panenka-style to win the match.

After the game, Suárez said, "I made the save of the tournament," and, referring to the infamous handball goal scored by Diego Maradona in the 1986 World Cup, claimed that "The 'Hand of God' now belongs to me". Suárez claimed he had no alternative and was acting out of instinct. Forlán agreed that Suárez saved the game, "Suárez this time, instead of scoring goals, he saved one, I think he saved the game." Ghana coach Milovan Rajevac said the play was an "injustice" and Suárez was labeled a "villain" and a "cheat". But Uruguay coach, Óscar Tabárez, said these labels were too harsh: "Well, there was a handball in the penalty area, there was a red card and Suárez was thrown out. Saying that Ghana were cheated out of the game is too harsh. We have to go by the rules. It might have been a mistake by my player but I do not like that word 'cheating'."
Ghana was the last African team left in the tournament and if they had won, they would have been the first team from Africa to ever qualify for the semi-finals. Thus, Suárez was said to have "enraged an entire continent [Africa]." But others viewed him as a hero who sacrificed himself in the semi-final for the unlikely chance that his team could win. A distraught Gyan conceded, "I would say Suárez is a hero now in his own country, because the ball was going in and he held it with his hand. He is a hero now."

Argentina vs Germany

On 3 July 2010, Germany beat Argentina 4–0 at the Cape Town Stadium to reach the semi-finals. It was the third time in the tournament that Germany had scored four goals in a match. Germany's first goal was scored by Thomas Müller in the third minute of the match with a header from a free kick taken by Bastian Schweinsteiger. Early in the second half, Argentina pressed Germany and came close to scoring on a number of occasions, but Germany hit back on a counter-attack in the 67th minute when Miroslav Klose scored into an empty goal from a pass by Lukas Podolski. Germany's third goal came from Arne Friedrich after sliding the ball inside from Schweinsteiger's pass seven minutes later, before Klose took the score to 4–0, volleying the ball into the net off a cross from Mesut Özil. The 4–0 defeat was Argentina's biggest loss at a World Cup since 1974, a tournament which was ironically held in then-West Germany. Germany's coach Joachim Löw hailed his side's performance as one of "absolute class", but admitted the suspension of Müller for picking up a yellow card was a blow.

Paraguay vs Spain
On 3 July 2010, Spain defeated Paraguay 1–0, to secure entry to the semi-finals where they would meet Germany. It was the first time that Spain had progressed to the semi-final of a World Cup since 1950; while for Paraguay, the quarter-final appearance was also the country's best ever performance.
The first half of the match finished goalless, although both sides had chances to score and Paraguay's Nelson Valdez had a goal ruled out as offside. The match suddenly became eventful in the second half due to a string of penalty kicks. First, Óscar Cardozo was pulled down by Gerard Piqué in Spain's penalty area and Paraguay was awarded a penalty. Cardozo took the penalty himself but it was saved by Spain's goalkeeper Iker Casillas. Spain soon after launched an attack at the other end of the field, in which David Villa was ruled by the referee to have been brought down by Antolín Alcaraz. Xabi Alonso stepped up to take the penalty kick and seemed to have scored, only for the referee to order it be retaken because of encroachment by a Spanish player into the penalty area before the kick was taken. Xabi Alonso's retake was saved by Paraguayan goalkeeper Justo Villar. As a result, the score remained 0–0 after the three penalty kicks. However, Spain ultimately managed to take the lead in the 82nd minute: David Villa collected a rebounded shot off the post from Pedro, to score himself off both posts. The goal turned out to be the winner for Spain.
After the match, Spain's coach Vicente del Bosque conceded that his side were not playing at their best and were starved of possession. He also noted his view that Spain's next opponents Germany were the best team at the World Cup. Paraguay's coach Gerardo Martino stated he would be leaving his position at the end of his contract.

Semi-finals

Uruguay vs Netherlands
Uruguay played the Netherlands in the first semi-final on 6 July 2010 at the Cape Town Stadium. The Netherlands won the match 3–2, thereby qualifying for the final for the first time since the 1978 World Cup.
Uruguay adopted a defensive posture early in the match, but were only able to hold their opponents scoreless for 18 minutes, when Dutch captain Giovanni van Bronckhorst scored from 35 yards into the top right corner of the goal. However, the Netherlands were unable to capitalise on their lead, as Diego Forlán equalised in the 41st minute (1–1) when his shot from 25 yards hit squarely in the middle of the goal was misjudged by goalkeeper Maarten Stekelenburg who missed it by millimetres. The Netherlands regained the lead in the second half, as a pass from Rafael van der Vaart reached Wesley Sneijder who hit it into the side-netting as Muslera dived and missed it by inches. Three minutes later, Kuyt crossed to Robben, who headed it in to make it 3–1. The Netherlands suffered a late scare when Maxi Pereira, who missed a penalty against Ghana, scored a stoppage-time free kick; however, the match finished 3–2 despite desperate Uruguayan attempts to equalise. After the match, Uruguay coach Óscar Tabárez spoke of his pride in his team for reaching the semi-finals.

Germany vs Spain
On 7 July 2010, Spain defeated Germany 1–0 in a rematch of the UEFA Euro 2008 Final (also won 1-0 by Spain) at the Moses Mabhida Stadium in Durban to progress to the World Cup Final against the Netherlands. It was the first time that Spain had ever gone through to the final of the World Cup, while it was the second consecutive World Cup in which Germany had lost in the semi-finals, having lost to Italy at home four years before.

Spain had the bulk of possession throughout the match, with Germany adopting a tight defensive structure. Germany created chances on the counter-attack, but Spain also went close to scoring on numerous occasions in each half. The match was deadlocked at 0–0 until the 73rd minute, when Spain was awarded a corner. The corner, taken by Xavi, was met by Carles Puyol, who headed the ball into the net as Manuel Neuer didn't do much to protect it to give Spain the lead. Thereafter, Spain protected its advantage and won the match.

After the match, Spain's coach Vicente del Bosque praised the "excellent performance" of his team, while Germany's coach Joachim Löw predicted that Spain would win the final.

Third place play-off
On 10 July 2010, at the Nelson Mandela Bay Stadium in Port Elizabeth, Germany defeated Uruguay 3–2 to claim third place at the World Cup for the second successive time after also finishing third at the 2006 FIFA World Cup. In the 19th minute, Bastian Schweinsteiger managed to take a shot towards the goal, which Muslera rebounded towards the onrushing Thomas Müller. Uruguay forced their way back into the match after Luis Suárez's pass put Edinson Cavani through on the left. He slid low into the far corner to put the South American side on level terms after 28 minutes. Diego Forlán then put them ahead six minutes into the second half with a beautiful side volley from the edge of the penalty box while goalkeeper Hans-Jörg Butt didn't move off his line. Marcell Jansen then scored on 56 minutes after Muslera came for Jérôme Boateng's cross but missed it right in front of Jansen, allowing him to head into an empty net. Mesut Özil took a corner in the 82nd minute, which reached a German player, bounced off him and went up to Khedira's head, who headed it in. Uruguay almost forced extra time when Forlán curled a 92nd-minute free kick onto the bar, but Germany held on to win the match. This was the eighth consecutive World Cup in which European teams finished third, stretching back to 1982.

After the game, Uruguay coach Óscar Tabárez insisted that his side did not deserve to be on the losing side: "We achieved an equal game against a real power, we could have won because in the game [they] were not superior to us ... We're not that far away [from Germany's level], the route has been marked, we must learn from this."

Final

References

External links
 
 The official 2010 host country website
 Germany v England | 2010 FIFA World Cup | Full Match on YouTube

Knockout stage
2010
Knockout
Knockout
Knockout
Knockout
Knockout
Knockout
Knockout
Knockout
Knockout
Knockout
Knockout
Ghana at the 2010 FIFA World Cup
Japan at the 2010 FIFA World Cup
Slovakia at the 2010 FIFA World Cup
South Korea at the 2010 FIFA World Cup
Chile at the 2010 FIFA World Cup